is a Japanese professional ice hockey forward currently playing for the Tohoku Free Blades in the Asia League.

Tanaka has played for the Tohoku Free Blades since 2010. He previously played at university level for Meiji University. He has also played in the senior Japan national team since 2012.

External links
 Tanaka, Ryo's profile
 Free Blades's players profile

1987 births
Sportspeople from Sapporo
Japanese ice hockey forwards
Living people